Clay Boland was a dentist and composer of popular songs. He was born October 25, 1903, in Olyphant, Pennsylvania, United States.

He studied dentistry at the University of Philadelphia. In 1924, he won a university competition for a prom song with a composition entitled Dreary Weather. He then composed music for the university's Mask and Wig Club, collaborating especially with lyricist Moe Jaffe in writing the songs for many of their shows. He also performed as a pianist with leading big bands of the era and was noted for his skills as an arranger. He subsequently practised as a dentist in Ardmore, Pennsylvania but continued to compose and participate as a partner in the music publishing business.

During World War II, he served as a lieutenant commander in the US Navy's Dental Corps, and was called up again for active duty in 1950 at the time of the Korean War.

In later life, he lived in Elizabeth, New Jersey and died on July 23, 1963, aged 59, in the Naval Hospital of St. Albans, Queens.

Compositions
 "An Apple a Day"
 "Delightful Delerium"
 "Midnight on the Trail"
 "The Gypsy in My Soul"
 "Too Good to Be True"
 "The Morning After"
 "Something Has Happened to Me"
 "Stop Beating Around the Mulberry Bush"
 "Stop, It's Wonderful"
 "Tell Me at Midnight"
 "When I Climb Down from My Saddle"

Shows
 This Mad Whirl

References

1903 births
1963 deaths
American dentists
Songwriters from Pennsylvania
20th-century American musicians
20th-century dentists
University of Pennsylvania alumni